Richard Carew (17 July 1555 – 6 November 1620) was a British translator and antiquary. He is best known for his county history, Survey of Cornwall (1602).

Life
Carew belonged to a prominent gentry family, and was the eldest son of Thomas Carew: he was born on 17 July 1555 at East Antony, Cornwall. He was educated at Christ Church, Oxford, where he was a contemporary of Sir Philip Sidney and William Camden, and then at the Middle Temple. He made a translation of the first five cantos of Tasso's Jerusalem Delivered (1594), which was more correct than that of Edward Fairfax. He also translated Juan de la Huarte's Examen de Ingenios, basing his translation on Camillo Camilli's Italian version. (This book is the first systematic attempt to relate physiology with psychology, though based on the medicine of Galen. )

Carew was a member of the Elizabethan Society of Antiquaries, and is particularly known for his Survey of Cornwall (1602), the second English county history to appear in print. Later editions were published in 1723, 1769 and 1811, and Davies Gilbert published an index in his Cornwall, vol. 4, pp. 381–92. He also published an Epistle concerning the Excellencies of the English Tongue (1605).

Carew served as High Sheriff of Cornwall (1583 and 1586), and as MP for Saltash in 1584. He was married to Juliana Arundell, the eldest daughter of Sir John Arundell of Trerice; their son Richard Carew was created a baronet in 1641 (see Carew baronets).

He was a beekeeper and a keen fisherman.

Carew died on 6 November 1620 and was buried in Antony church on 7 November.

Selected publications
Survey of Cornwall, 1769 edition
The Survey of Cornwall, by Richard Carew of Antony; ed. with an introduction by F. E. Halliday. London: Andrew Melrose, 1953; reissued in 1969 by Adams & Dart, London  (includes an informative introduction, pp. 15–73, four minor works of Carew, and Norden's maps)
The Survey of Cornwall 1602; Tamar Books, 2000 
The Survey of Cornwall; J. Chynoweth, N. Orme & A. Walsham, eds. (Devon and Cornwall Record Society. New series; 47.) Exeter: D. C. R. S, 2004 (introduction, ca. 50 p.; facsimile reproduction, originally published:- London: John Jaggard, 1602, 168 ff.)

Notes

References

External links

 
 
 
 Birds of Cornwall and Richard Carew
 

1555 births
1620 deaths
People from Antony, Cornwall
British antiquarians
Alumni of Christ Church, Oxford
Writers from Cornwall
Lord-Lieutenants of Cornwall
Members of the pre-1707 English Parliament for constituencies in Cornwall
16th-century English writers
16th-century male writers
17th-century English writers
17th-century English male writers
16th-century English translators
16th-century antiquarians
17th-century antiquarians
16th-century Anglican theologians
17th-century Anglican theologians
High Sheriffs of Cornwall
Richard
Cornish-language writers
British ornithological writers
Burials in Cornwall
16th-century English historians
17th-century English historians